Picture Puzzle, also known as Picture Puzzle Peak, is a 13,297-foot-elevation (4,053 meter) mountain summit located one mile east of the crest of the Sierra Nevada mountain range in Inyo County of northern California, United States. It is situated in the Palisades area of the John Muir Wilderness, on land managed by Inyo National Forest. Picture Puzzle ranks as the 90th-highest summit in California, and the third-highest peak of the Inconsolable Range.

Climbing
Established climbing routes on Picture Puzzle:
 Northeast Couloir – 
 North Slope – class 3 
 West Face – class 4

The first ascent of the summit was made June 15, 1937, by Norman Clyde, who is credited with 130 first ascents, most of which were in the Sierra Nevada.

Climate
According to the Köppen climate classification system, Picture Puzzle is located in an alpine climate zone. Most weather fronts originate in the Pacific Ocean, and travel east toward the Sierra Nevada mountains. As fronts approach, they are forced upward by the peaks, causing them to drop their moisture in the form of rain or snowfall onto the range (orographic lift). Precipitation runoff from this mountain drains east into headwaters of North Fork Big Pine Creek, and west into headwaters of South Fork Bishop Creek.

Gallery

See also
 
 List of the major 4000-meter summits of California

References

External links
 Weather forecast: Picture Puzzle
 Picture Puzzle from Chocolate Peak: Flickr photo
 Cloudripper and Picture Puzzle: Flickr photo

Inyo National Forest
Mountains of Inyo County, California
Mountains of the John Muir Wilderness
North American 4000 m summits
Mountains of Northern California
Sierra Nevada (United States)